The Cape Verdean Blues is a 1966 album by a jazz quintet led by pianist Horace Silver. The quintet is augmented on the last three tracks on the album by trombonist J. J. Johnson. The album was inspired by Silver's father, John Tavares Silva, who was born in Cape Verde.

Track listing
All tracks by Horace Silver, unless otherwise noted

"The Cape Verdean Blues" - 4:59
"The African Queen" - 9:36
"Pretty Eyes" - 7:30
"Nutville" - 7:15
"Bonita" - 8:37
"Mo' Joe" (Joe Henderson) - 5:46

Recorded on October 1 (#1-3) and 22 (#4-6), 1965.

Personnel
Horace Silver – piano
Woody Shaw – trumpet
Joe Henderson – tenor sax
J. J. Johnson – trombone (tracks 4–6)
Bob Cranshaw – bass
Roger Humphries – drums

Source:

References

External links 

1966 albums
Blue Note Records albums
Albums produced by Alfred Lion
Horace Silver albums